Samy Benchamma (born 25 June 2000) is a French professional footballer who plays as a midfielder for Chamois Niortais.

Career 
Samy Benchamma first classed at the US Payrin Rigautou Club, then at FC Pays Mazamétain before joining Castres Football, where he was spotted by the recruits of Montpellier.

Coming from the Montpellier academy, Benchama signed his first contrat with the club in May 2020.

He made his professional debut for Montpellier in a 2–1 Ligue 1 loss to Rennes on 29 August 2020.

On 18 June 2021 it was announced that Benchama had signed for Chamois Niortais.

Personal life
Born in France, Benchama is of Algerian descent.

Career statistics

References

External links

2000 births
Living people
People from Castres
French footballers
French sportspeople of Algerian descent
Association football midfielders
Montpellier HSC players
Chamois Niortais F.C. players
Championnat National 2 players
Championnat National 3 players
Ligue 1 players
Ligue 2 players
Sportspeople from Tarn (department)
Footballers from Occitania (administrative region)